Dame d'atour was an office at the royal court of France. It existed in nearly all French courts from the 16th-century onward. The dame d'honneur was selected from the members of the highest French nobility.

History
At least from the Isabeau of Bavaria's tenure as queen, there had been a post named demoiselle d'atour or femme d'atour, but this had originally been the title of the queen's chambermaids and divided among several people.

The office of dame d'atour, created in 1534, was one of the highest-ranking offices among the ladies-in-waiting of the queen and given only to members of the nobility.

The dame d'atour had the responsibility of the queen's wardrobe and jewelry and supervised the dressing of the queen and the chamber staff of femme du chambre.

When the dame d'honneur was absent, she was replaced by the dame d'atour as the supervisor of the female personnel of the queen.

List of Dames d'atour to the queens and empresses of France

Dame d'atour to Catherine de' Medici 1547–1589
 1547–1549 : Marie-Catherine Gondi 
 1549-1552 : Jacqueline de l'Hospital Dame d'Aisnay 
 1552–1559 : Madeleine Buonaiuti, Madame Alamanni, Mme de Gondi

Dame d'atour to Élisabeth d'Autriche 
 1570–1574: Marguerite de La Marck-Arenberg

Dame d'atour to Louise of Lorraine 1575–1601
 1575–1590: Louise de la Béraudière

Dame d'atour to Marie de' Medici 1600–1632

 1600–1617: Leonora Dori
 1617–1619: Vacant
 1619–1625: Nicole du Plessis de Mailly, marquise de Brezé
 1625–1631: Duchesse d'Aiguillon

Dame d'atour to Anne of Austria 1615–1666

 1615–1619: Luisa de Osorio (jointly with de Vernet)
 1615-1626: Antoinette d'Albert de Luynes, Dame de Vernet (jointly with de Osorio)
 1626-1626: Marie-Catherine de Senecey
 1626-1630: Madeleine du Fargis
 1630–1657: Catherine le Voyer de Lignerolles, Baronne du Bellay, Dame de la Flotte
 1637–1639: Marie de Hautefort, 'Madame de Hautefort' (deputy dame d'atour, first term)
 1643–1644: Marie de Hautefort, duchesse de Schomberg (second term as deputy)
 1657–1666: Louise Boyer, duchesse de Noailles

Dame d'atour to Maria Theresa of Spain 1660–1683

 1660–1683: Anne Marie de Beauvilliers, Countess of Bethune

Dame d'atour to Marie Leszczyńska 1725–1768

 1725–1731: Anne-Marie-Francoise de Sainte-Hermine, comtesse de Mailly
 1731-1742: Francoise de Mailly, duchesse de Mazarin
 1742–1768: Amable-Gabrielle de Noailles, duchesse de Villars

Dame d'atour to Marie Antoinette 1770–1791

 1770-1771: Amable-Gabrielle de Villars 
 1771–1775: Adelaide-Diane-Hortense Mancini-Mazarin, duchesse de Cossé
 1775–1775: Laure-Auguste de Fitz-James, Princess de Chimay 
 1775–1781: Marie-Jeanne de Talleyrand-Périgord, duchesse de Mailly
 1781–1791: Geneviève de Gramont, comtesse d'Ossun

Dame d'atour to Joséphine de Beauharnais 1804–1809

 1804–1809: Émilie de Beauharnais

Dame d'atour to Marie Louise 1810–1814

 1810–1814: Jeanne Charlotte du Luçay

See also
 First Lady of the Bedchamber, British equivalent
 Maid of the Bedchamber

References

 Mathieu da Vinha & Raphaël Masson: Versailles: Histoire, Dictionnaire et Anthologie
 Anselme de Sainte-Marie & Ange de Sainte-Rosalie: Histoire généalogique et chronologique de la Maison Royale de France

Ancien Régime
Ancien Régime office-holders
French monarchy
Court titles in the Ancien Régime
Gendered occupations
French royal court